The following is a timeline of the history of the city of Braunschweig (Brunswick), Germany.

Prior to 19th century

 861 - According to legend, Braunschweig founded by Bruno of Saxony.
 955 - Area of city expanded.
 1031 -  church consecrated.
 1145 - Riddagshausen Abbey founded.
 1160s - Henry the Lion makes Braunschweig his residence.
 1166 - Brunswick Lion statue created.
 1175
 Dankwarderode Castle built.
 Birth of Otto IV, Holy Roman Emperor
 1188 - Gospels of Henry the Lion created.
 1190s -  church construction begins.
 1194 - Brunswick Cathedral built.
 1194 - 6 August: Henry the Lion dies.
 1200s
  church construction begins.
 Braunschweig joins the Hanseatic League.
  (carnival) is celebrated.
 1245 -  (nursing home and orphanage) established.
 1293–94 -  (civil unrest)
 1304 -  on  first mentioned.
 1307 -  guildhall/exchange first mentioned.
 1312 - Rüningen gristmill first mentioned.
 1370s -  (civil unrest)
 1390
 Public clock installed (approximate date).
 Brunswick Mum is sold.
 1396 -  (city hall) building expanded.
 1410s
  (library) built.
  (conflict between city council and churches)
 1411 - Faule Mette cannon created.
 1415 -  secondary school established.
 1420 -  church built (approximate date).
 1432 - The Princes of Brunswick-Wolfenbüttel move their Residenz from Braunschweig to Wolfenbüttel.
 1434 - Aegidienkirche (church) built (approximate date).
 1445–46 -  (civil unrest)
 1451 -  (church) built.
 1487–89 -  (civil unrest)
 1498 -  (fair) established.
 1509 - Printing press in operation.
 1520s - Protestant Reformation in Braunschweig.
 1524 -  built.
 1531–32 - Braunschweig joins Schmalkaldic League.
 1534 -  built.
 1551 - Population: 16,192.
 1567 -  built.
 1627 -  (brewery) established.
 1643 -  (customs house) built.
 1663 - Trial and execution of Anna Roleffes.
 1671 - Siege of Braunschweig by Rudolph Augustus, Duke of Brunswick-Lüneburg
 1690 -  (opera house and theatre) opens.
 1745
 Collegium Carolinum founded.
 Braunschweigische Anzeigen newspaper in publication.
 1753 - Brunswick Palace established as the new ducal residence.
 1754 - Herzog Anton Ulrich-Museum and State Natural History Museum open.
 1761 - First Battle of Ölper
 1768 - Birth of Caroline of Brunswick future wife of George IV.
 1769 - Schloss Richmond (castle) built.
 1772 - 13 March: Premiere of Lessing's play Emilia Galotti.
 1773 - Population: 23,385.
 1790s -  dismantled (approximate date).
 1791 -  (bridge) rebuilt.
 1799 - Friedrich Vieweg (publisher) moves to Braunschweig.

19th century
 1806 - French in power;  begins.
 1807 -  becomes mayor.
 1809 - 1 August: Second Battle of Ölper
 1815 - Duchy of Brunswick established
 1829 - 19 January: Premiere of Goethe's play Faust, Part One.
 1830 - 7–8 September: Civil unrest, Brunswick Palace stormed by an angry mob and destroyed completely.
 1834 - Attained municipal self-government.
 1835 - Grotrian-Steinweg established.
 1838 - Westermann Verlag (publisher) in business.
 1838 - 1 December: First section of the Brunswick–Bad Harzburg railway line, connecting Braunschweig and Wolfenbüttel, opens.
 1843–44 - Hanover–Brunswick railway opens.
 1844 - Rabbinical Conference of Brunswick
 1847 - MTV Braunschweig established.
 1848–49 - 
 1849 - Voigtländer sets up its office in Braunschweig.
 1853 -  active.
 1856 -  (magazine) headquartered in Braunschweig.
 1860 -  established.
 1861
 Staatstheater Braunschweig (theatre) opens.
  (library) and  founded.
 1863 -  sculpture erected atop the palace.
 1871
  newspaper in publication.
  brewery in business.
 Population: 57,883.
 1872 - Brunswick–Magdeburg railway begins operating.
 1874 - Konrad Koch introduces football to Germany.
 1875 - 23 September:  opens.
 1879 - Trams in Braunschweig begin operating.
 1880 - Population: 75,038.
 1885 - Population: 85,174.
 1887 -  (cemetery) established.
 1890 - Population: 101,047.
 1891 - Braunschweigisches Landesmuseum founded.
 1894–1900 - New  (city hall) built.
 1895
  bookseller in business.
 Population: 115,138.

20th century

1900–1945
 1901 -  (historical society) founded.
 1903 - Büssing established.
 1905 - Population: 136,423.
 1906 - Dankwarderode Castle reconstructed.
 1907 -  (bicycle manufactory) in business.
 1909 - 21 April: Gymnasium Gaussschule established.
 1913 - 24 May: Marriage of Ernest Augustus, Duke of Brunswick and Princess Victoria Louise of Prussia.
 1918
  occurs.
 8 November: Ernest Augustus forced to abdicate.
 10 November: Socialist Republic of Brunswick proclaimed.
 10 November: Free State of Brunswick established.
 1919
 9 April: Spartacus League uprising.
 13–17 April: State of emergency declared, Freikorps troops enter city.
 Population: 139,539.
 1920 - Rollei established.
 1923 - 17 June: Eintracht-Stadion opens.
 1929 - Deutsche Verkehrsfliegerschule moved to Broitzem.
 1931
  is incorporated into the city of Braunschweig.
  (newspaper) begins publication.
 17–18 October: A large Nazi rally is held in Braunschweig, 100,000 SA stormtroopers march through the city.
 1933 - Mittelland Canal reaches Braunschweig.
 1934
 Population: 166,823.
 1935 - SS-Junkerschule Braunschweig established.
 1936
 Luftfahrtforschungsanstalt in Völkenrode built.
 Braunschweig Airport opens.
 1938
  (formerly Brunswick State Conservatoire) established.
 23 February: Volkswagenwerk Braunschweig starts production.
 9–10 November: Kristallnacht in Braunschweig.
 1939
 Nazi Academy for Youth Leadership built.
 Population: 208,400.
 1940
 Synagogue demolished.
 Bombing of Braunschweig in World War II begins.
 1943 - Entbindungsheim für Ostarbeiterinnen established.
 1944
 25 March: Subcamp of the Neuengamme concentration camp established at the SS troop supply camp.
 5 June: Subcamp of Neuengamme at the SS troop supply camp dissolved. Prisoners deported to a subcamp in Warberg.
 17 August: Schillstraße subcamp of the Neuengamme concentration camp established.
 September: Braunschweig-Vechelde subcamp of Neuengamme established.
 December: Women subcamp of Neuengamme established at the SS Riding School.
 1945
 February: Women subcamp of Neuengamme at the SS Riding School dissolved. Prisoners deported to subcamps in Salzgitter and Helmstedt.
 March: Braunschweig-Vechelde subcamp of Neuengamme dissolved. Prisoners moved to the Schillstraße subcamp.
 March/April: Schillstraße subcamp of Neuengamme dissolved. Prisoners sent on a death march to Salzgitter.
 12 April: .

1946–1999
 1946 - Braunschweiger Zeitung (newspaper) begins publication.
 1947 - Physikalisch-Technische Bundesanstalt refounded in Braunschweig.
 1949
  (school) established.
  bookshop in business.
 1955 - 1 February: Luftfahrt-Bundesamt opens.
 1960
 Brunswick Palace demolished.
 Building of the Weststadt starts.
 1 October: Braunschweig Hauptbahnhof opens.
 1963 - Hochschule für Bildende Künste Braunschweig established.
 1971 - Fachhochschule Braunschweig/Wolfenbüttel established.
 1972 - Braunschweiger Verkehrs-AG (public transit entity) active.
 1974 - 28 February: District of Braunschweig disestablished and its main part incorporated into the city of Braunschweig.
 1975 - Population: 269,900.
 1976 - Gerhard Glogowski becomes mayor.
 1977 - Federal Agricultural Research Centre established.
 1982 -  established.
 1987 - Deutsche Sammlung von Mikroorganismen und Zellkulturen moves to Braunschweig.
 1988 - Braunschweig Classix Festival established.
 1991–94 - Reconstruction of Alte Waage.
 1994 - Sparkassen Open tennis tournament established.
 1998 - 1 September: German Federal Bureau of Aircraft Accident Investigation established.
 2000
 Wilhelm Raabe Literature Prize established.
 20 September: Volkswagen Halle opens.

21st century

 2006 - 6 December:  opens.
 2007 - 6 May: Rebuilt Brunswick Palace opens.
 2010 -  light rail project cancelled.
 2013 - Population: 247,227.
 2014 -  becomes mayor.

Images

See also
 Braunschweig history
 
 

Other cities in the state of Lower Saxony:(de)
 Timeline of Hanover

References

This article incorporates information from the German Wikipedia.

Bibliography

in English

in German
  (bibliography)

External links

 Links to fulltext city directories for Braunschweig via Wikisource

 
Years in Germany
Braunschweig
Braunschweig